A shield law is legislation designed to protect reporters' privilege.  This privilege involves the right of news reporters to refuse to testify as to the information and/or sources of information obtained during the news gathering and dissemination process. Currently, the U.S. federal government has not enacted any national shield laws, but most of the 50 states do have shield laws or other protections for reporters in place.

Definition
A shield law is law that gives reporters protection against being forced to disclose confidential information or sources in state court. There is no federal shield law and state shield laws vary in scope. In general however, a shield law aims to provide the protection of: "a reporter cannot be forced to reveal his or her source". Thus, a shield law provides a privilege to a reporter pursuant to which the reporter cannot be forced by subpoena or other court order to testify about information contained in a news story and/or the source of that information.  Several shield laws additionally provide protection for the reporter even if the source or information is revealed during the dissemination of the news story, that is whether or not the source or information is confidential. Depending on the jurisdiction, the privilege may be total or qualified, and it may also apply to other persons involved in the news-gathering and dissemination process as well, such as an editor or a publisher. However, shield laws do not ensure absolute protection.

Origins
The issue of whether or not journalists can be subpoenaed and forced to reveal confidential information arose in 1972 with the United States Supreme Court case Branzburg v. Hayes. Paul Branzburg was a reporter for The Courier-Journal in Louisville, Kentucky and wrote an article about the drug hashish. In creating the article, he came in contact with two local citizens who had created and used the drug. Because their activity was illegal, Branzburg promised the two individuals that he would not reveal their identities. After the article was published, Branzburg was subpoenaed by a local grand jury and ordered to reveal the identity of his sources. Branzburg refused and cited the provisions for freedom of the press from the First Amendment of the Constitution, in his defense.

The Supreme Court decided in a five to four decision that the press did not have a Constitutional right of protection from revealing confidential information in court. The court acknowledged, however, that the government must "convincingly show a substantial relation between the information sought and a subject of overriding and compelling state interest." While this ruling did not set a precedent for journalistic rights in court, it did define a more stringent set of requirements for when a journalist could be subpoenaed in court.

This ruling was limited in nature, did not set a clear federal precedent regarding journalistic privileges from revealing confidential information, and thus has been interpreted and cited differently by courts over the years. The Third Circuit Court of Appeals, for instance, has gleaned a qualified First Amendment privilege from the Branzburg decision. In Riley v. City of Chester, the Court held that a reporter's right to protect his sources from disclosure could be overcome by a party who, by a preponderance of the evidence, demonstrated that he has made an effort to obtain the information elsewhere, that the only access to the information sought is through the journalist and his or her source, and that the information sought is crucial to the case. 612 F.2d 708 (3rd Cir. 1979).

State laws

States differ on their approach to protecting reporter's privilege. , 49 states and the District of Columbia offer some form of protections Forty states (plus D.C.) have passed shield laws. These laws vary from state to state. Some protections apply to civil but not to criminal proceedings. Other laws protect journalists from revealing confidential sources, but not other information. Many states have also established court precedents which provide protection to journalists, usually based on constitutional arguments. Only Wyoming lacks both legislation and judicial precedent to protect reporter's privilege.

Current issues

Proponents of shield laws argue that they ensure that news gatherers may do their jobs to their fullest ability and that they help avoid a dichotomy between state laws and journalistic ethics, but the differences between states' laws has raised questions regarding which laws apply where in regard to national reporting.  Proponents argue that a federal shield law should exist to eliminate contradictions between state laws.

Opponents argue that shield laws afford extra privileges to journalists and that no citizen should be able to ignore a court ordered subpoena. Opponents also cite problems with defining who is considered a journalist or news gatherer and who is not, and note that if journalists get special protection from the government, then they are getting special journalistic benefits from the government instead of acting in complete independence.  Some opponents also argue that journalists are often forced to testify by federal courts only in cases where a federal shield law likely would not protect them anyway.  Finally, the federal government may not have constitutional right to enforce a shield law on state courts.

Many journalists, however, are subpoenaed to testify in criminal and civil cases for coverage of a variety of matters that do not involve questions of national security.  In recent years, there have been bills for federal shield laws in the United States Congress; however, none of these bills have passed the Senate.  A primary objection to recent efforts to pass a federal shield law has been concern about leaks of classified information, particularly given the modern potential of such leaks to be published globally on the Internet by non-traditional recipients, such as WikiLeaks, who might claim to be "journalists" under an unqualified shield law.

Sometimes, the press is not even immune from its sources, such as when the source wishes to remain anonymous and the journalist wishes to disclose it. Such was the case in Cohen v. Cowles Media Co. (1991). The Supreme Court upheld that a source may have a right to confidentiality if an agreement was made with the reporter.  Unfortunately, the bigger issue of source disclosure gets even more confusing, since the Cohen and Branzburg decisions could allow for the possibility of a journalist being subpoenaed by a court to disclose the name of a source, and being sued by a source under promissory estoppel laws for that disclosure.  The current laws of the land, and the gray areas of forecasting potential consequences of publishing a story with confidential sources places the press in a very precarious situation.  The current shield laws in some states give the press somewhat of an upper hand. However, since federal law does not recognize reportorial privilege in most cases, it is understandable how the press might feel muzzled.

The shield law privilege may also be waived by a reporter, as the New Jersey Supreme Court recently found in the case of In re Michael G. Venezia.  In that case, a New Jersey newspaper published an article containing defamatory statements about the plaintiff.  The article attributed the statements to a source who was identified by name in the article; the source later denied making the defamatory statements.  The plaintiff filed a defamation lawsuit against the newspaper, the reporter and the alleged source of the defamatory statements.  When the plaintiff sought to question the newspaper reporter about the article, the reporter and his newspaper refused, claiming protection under New Jersey's shield law.  It was discovered, however, that the reporter had already given a statement under oath concerning the article—and, most important, the alleged source of the statement and exactly what that source said—to a local county prosecutor's office.  The reporter also talked about his source and what the source said with a local municipal attorney.  The Venezia court unanimously held that, while New Jersey has arguably the most protective shield law in the United States, a reporter waives the privilege when he talks about his sources and information outside of the newsgathering process, as did the reporter in Venezia.  The Venezia court stated: "The privilege holder is not permitted to step from behind the shield as he pleases, sallying forth one moment to make a disclosure to one person and then to seek the shield's protection from having to repeat the same disclosure to another person.  A reporter cannot play peek-a-boo with the privilege."  Thus, the Venezia court ordered that the reporter must submit to the plaintiff's deposition request.  Venezia is highly significant because it marks the first time that a reporter has ever been found to have waived the privilege under New Jersey's current shield law, and because it explores the issue of what is or is not a "newsgathering activity," and, thus, what activities are subject to protection under the law.

Currently, courts are struggling to define the standards for when shield laws should apply to non-traditional media outlets, particularly in the context of blogs and Internet publishing. In Obsidian Finance Group, LLC v. Cox, the United States District Court for the District of Oregon found that to qualify as a reporter, a standard of professionalism  must be met, including but not limited to being associated with a traditional news print or television media outlet or obtaining a journalism degree. A subsequent opinion in the same case clarified that these were examples and not requirements; bloggers could qualify, and the denial of media status in the Cox case appears to have been largely motivated by the defendant reportedly offering to remove accusations for a substantial fee. Conversely, in The Mortgage Specialists, Inc. v. Implode-Explode Heavy Industries, Inc. the New Hampshire Supreme Court adopted a much broader definition of media that applies to blogs and website curators, reiterating that "freedom of the press is a fundamental personal right which is not confined to newspapers and periodicals."

In July 2013 the White House was pushing for a federal media shield law named the Free Flow of Information Act authored by U.S. Senators Charles Schumer and Lindsey Graham. Under the bill, the scope of protection for reporters would vary according to whether it was a civil case, an ordinary criminal case or a national security case. The greatest protection would be given to civil cases, in which litigants seeking to force reporters to testify or trying to obtain their calling information would be required to show why their need for the information outweighed the public's interest in unfettered news gathering. Ordinary criminal cases would work in a similar fashion, except the burden would be on the reporter seeking to quash the subpoena to show by a "clear and convincing" standard that the public interest in the free flow of information should prevail over the needs of law enforcement. Cases involving the disclosure of classified information would be more heavily tilted toward the government. Judges could not quash a subpoena through a balancing test if prosecutors presented facts showing that the information sought might help prevent a terrorist attack or other acts likely to harm national security. The legislation would create a presumption that when the government is seeking calling records from a telephone carrier, the news organization would be notified ahead of time, allowing it to fight the subpoena in court. But the bill would also allow the government to seek a 45- to 90-day delay in notification if a court determines that such notice would threaten the integrity of the investigation. The legislation would also include an exception where journalists could be subpoenaed if it means national security is at risk.

Related issues 
In recent years, a larger effort by journalists to press for federal shield laws formed following the Plame affair, in which reporters who released the name of Valerie Plame were asked who their sources were. One of the reporters, Judith Miller of The New York Times, was jailed for 85 days in 2005 for refusing to disclose her source in the government probe.

There is also a question about whether or not journalists should be exempt from national security laws.

See also
 Free Flow of Information Act
 In re Madden
 Privilege (evidence)
 Reporter's privilege
 Source protection
 State v. Rinaldo
 Jana Winter: Fox News reporter subpoenaed to reveal sources in 2013 despite Colorado shield law
 Josh Wolf

Notes

References

Further reading

External links
Reporter's Shield Laws
Legal Liability Issues for Online Speech
BRANZBURG v. HAYES, 408 U.S. 665 (1972)
WV shield law passed
 Virginia's shield law

American journalism
Privileged communication
Sources (journalism)
United States evidence law